The 2016 Super Rugby Final was played between the Hurricanes and the Lions. It was the 21st final in the Super Rugby competition's history and the first under the expanded 18-team format. The Hurricanes had qualified in first place of the log standings during the regular season, while the Lions had qualified in second place. Both teams hosted quarter-final and semi-final matches. In the quarter-finals the Hurricanes beat the Sharks while the Lions beat the record Super rugby winners Crusaders. For the semi-finals it was the Hurricanes defeating fellow New Zealand team Chiefs in Wellington and the Lions defeating New Zealand team Highlanders in Johannesburg. Because of being the higher placed team in the regular season log standings, the final was held in Wellington.

The Final attracted a crowd attendance of 39,000.

Road to the Final

The 2016 Super Rugby competition involved an expanded 18-team format. The 18 teams were grouped geographically in two regional groups, each consisting of two conferences: the Australasian Group, with five teams in the Australian Conference and five teams in the New Zealand Conference and the South African Group, with six South African teams, one Argentinean team and one Japanese team split into a four-team Africa 1 Conference and a four-team Africa 2 Conference. The four conference winners qualified for the Quarter Finals, where they had home ground advantage against the four wildcard teams, made up of the third to fifth placed teams in the Australasian Group and the third placed team in the South African Group.

In the quarter-finals, there were wins for Highlanders over the Brumbies, Hurricanes beat Sharks while keeping them with no points, Lions beat Crusaders and Chiefs triumphing over Stormers. In the semi-finals, the Hurricanes defeated Chiefs in Wellington and the Lions defeated Highlanders in Johannesburg. The Hurricanes won their first title by defeating Lions.

The play-off fixtures were as follows:

Quarter-finals

Semi-finals

Final

Summary
The Hurricanes won their first Super Rugby title with a dominant 20-3 win over the Lions in Wellington with tries from Cory Jane and man-of-the-match Beauden Barrett. Victor Vito celebrated his 100th and final match for the Wellington-based side in style. Tries were difficult to get with the wet, cold and windy weather conditions with both tries scored off Lions mistakes and Barrett chipped in with 10 points from the boot with two conversions and two penalties to spark tumultuous scenes in the packed stadium. The Lions were unable to find a way to unlock the Hurricanes defence, while Elton Jantjies had a forgettable night in front of goal, scoring only one of his three kicks. The match began with Jantjies missing an early penalty and Jane had a try disallowed in the 6th minute after the TMO ruled correctly that Brad Shields had knocked-on in the build-up. The veteran winger was not to be denied for long, in the 22nd minute when the Hurricanes defence again proved its worth causing Jantjies to throw a wild pass under pressure in his own 22, forcing Lionel Mapoe to make a clearing kick, but the ball went straight to Jane, who raced in to score at the corner. Barrett slotted the conversion to add to the earlier 11th-minute penalty to give the Hurricanes a 10-0 lead. Jantjies reduced the deficit with a penalty three minutes later.

Barrett extended his side's lead to 13-3 with another penalty midway through the second half. The match was effectively ended as a contest 11 minutes from full-time when the Lions botched a lineout clearance close to their own line. Replacement hooker Ricky Riccitelli hacked the ball on and the fly-half pounced on it inside the Lions in-goal area for his side's second try making Hurricanes to become the fifth New Zealand side to be crowned Super champions having previously lost both the 2006 and 2015 finals as well as being five times beaten semi-finalists.

Details

References

Final
2016
2016 in New Zealand rugby union
2016 in South African rugby union
Hurricanes (rugby union) matches
Lions (United Rugby Championship) matches
Sports competitions in Wellington
2010s in Wellington
August 2016 sports events in New Zealand